Orthopterum is a genus of succulent plant in the family Aizoaceae, subfamily Ruschioideae. It is a low, clump-forming plant with thick, fleshy leaves and yellow flowers.

Species
Orthopterum coeganum
Orthopterum waltoniae

References

Aizoaceae
Aizoaceae genera
Taxa named by Louisa Bolus